Shashank (born 24 June 1972) is an Indian film director, screenwriter and lyricist who works in Kannada cinema. He made his debut as a director with the 2007 film Sixer. His second directorial Moggina Manasu (2008) received critical acclaim for its screenplay and its coming-of-age theme. He went on to direct other successful films in the romance genre such as Krishnan Love Story (2010) and Krishna-Leela (2015). He is also credited to have introduced actors Yash and Radhika Pandit who went on to become successful actors in Kannada cinema.

Early life
Shashank was born in a small village called Thaalya, in Chitradurga district, Karnataka. He is the third child of his parents Hanumanthappa and Lakkamma, his father was a small farmer. However he was later adopted by his maternal uncle and aunt, Chandrashekarappa and Shantamma. Since Chandrashekarappa worked in VISL, Bhadravati, Karnataka. Shashank completed his matriculation from Bhadravati. Later he did his diploma in civil engineering (1988–91) in Chikmagalur. His birth name was Umesh B.H. which he later changed to Shashank at his mentor Hamsalekha's insistence.

Personal life
He is married to Veena H.M and has two daughters, Chaitra and Khushi.

Career

Shashank trained as an engineer, and worked as a site engineer in Bangalore as a site engineer. He became an assistant to S. Mahendar for the film Taayi illada tavaru (1994). He subsequently worked with music director Hamsalekha. His first movie as an independent director was Sixer from 2007, produced by Ramoji Rao with music composed by Hamsalekha.

In addition to writing screenplays, dialogues and storylines for films, he has also written song lyrics.

Filmography

Awards and nominations

References

External links 

Kannada film directors
Living people
Filmfare Awards South winners
1972 births
Film directors from Karnataka
21st-century Indian film directors
People from Chitradurga district
Screenwriters from Karnataka
Kannada screenwriters